was a popular Japanese musician. He is ranked at No. 23 in a list of Japan's top 100 musicians by HMV.

Biography
He was born in Tokyo Setagaya Ward SDF Central Hospital to Kinue and Kenichi Ozaki. He has one older brother, Yasushi. Early in life, he was hospitalized with intestinal torsion and bronchitis which subsequently weakened his internal organs. In 1973 he began studying martial arts and continued training throughout his life. In January 1975 he began playing piano and in March of that year, he wrote his first poem. His first live performance was in 1978 at his school's cultural festival. He was discovered by producer Akira Sudo and signed to CBS Sony in 1983.

He debuted in December 1983 while he was still in high school with his hit single  and his album . He gained tremendous support from his younger fanbase with his devastating live performances along with his unique lyrics that expressed dreams and love or the meaning of life. He represented the angst of adolescence, and a lot of the times attacked what he felt was unfair in society or schools.

On April 25, 1992, Ozaki was found naked, drunk and unconscious in a Tokyo alleyway. He was taken by ambulance but was soon dismissed from the hospital. He died several hours later. The cause of death was reported as pulmonary edema but many theories have arisen as to the actual cause of death, the most popular being homicide. He was survived by his wife, Shigemi, and his son, Hiroya Ozaki.

Tribute covers

Thelma Aoyama, Akina Nakamori, Mika Nakashima, Kazumasa Oda, Ryuichi Kawamura, Hikaru Utada, Ayaka, Kobukuro, Tsuyoshi Domoto and many other Japanese artists have covered Ozaki's song, "I Love You". American singer-songwriter Debbie Gibson recorded an English-language cover of "I Love You" in her 2010 album Ms. Vocalist. In addition, American guitarist Marty Friedman recorded an instrumental cover of "I Love You" in his 2011 album Tokyo Jukebox 2.
Nanase Aikawa, Goto Maki, MINMI and Tomiko Van have covered "Oh My Little Girl". Shimizu Shota covered his song, "Forget-Me-Not" and Mr. Children has covered  on "ap' bank fes. 2010". In 2013, K-pop artist and main vocalist of Big Bang, Daesung (known in Japan as "D-Lite") covered "I Love You" and it was used as the theme song for the drama I Love You. In 2014, Tamai Shiori of Momoiro Clover Z, sang a cover of "Graduation" for a special concert.

Discography

Singles

"Jugo no Yoru" - The Night (15の夜, 1983)
"Junanasai no Chizu" - Seventeen's Map (十七歳の地図, 1984)
"Hajimari-sae Utaenai" - Can't Sing Even the Beginning (はじまりさえ歌えない, 1984)
"Sotsugyou" - Graduation (卒業, 1985)
"Driving All Night" (1985)
"Kaku" - Core (核, 1987)
"Taiyō no Hahen" - Scratch of the Sun(太陽の破片, 1988)
"Love Way" (1990)
"Tasogare-yuku Machi-de" - 57th Street (黄昏ゆく街で, 1990)
"Eien no Mune" - Eternal Heart (永遠の胸, 1991)
"I Love You" (1991)
"Kegareta Kizuna" - Bond (汚れた絆, 1992)
 (1994) – posthumously released

Albums

Juunanasai no Chizu - Seventeen's Map (十七歳の地図, 1983)
Kaikisen - Tropic of Graduation (回帰線, 1985)
Kowareta Tobira kara - Through the Broken Door (壊れた扉から, 1985)
Gairoju - Trees Lining a Street (街路樹, 1988)
Tanjou - Birth (誕生, 1990)
Hounetsu e no Akashi - Confession for Exist (放熱への証, 1992)

Compilations

Aisu-beki Mono Subete-ni - For All My Loves (愛すべきものすべてに, 1996)
Artery & Vein – The Very Best of Yutaka Ozaki (1999)
13/71 – The Best Selection (2004)

Live albums

Last Teenage Appearance – The Myth of Yutaka Ozaki (1987)
Yakusoku no Hi Vol.1 – The Day vol.1 (約束の日 Vol.1, 1993)
Yakusoku no Hi Vol.2 – The Day vol.2 (約束の日 Vol.2, 1993)
Missing Boy (1997)
Osaka Stadium on August 25 in 1985 Vol.1 (1998)
Osaka Stadium on August 25 in 1985 Vol.2 (1998)

Movie 
A 2011 TV-drama called Kaze no Shounen portrayed his life and in depth early career, from meeting his manager Sudo to his death. He was played by Hiroki Narimiya.

References

External links

Yutaka Ozaki Official Site 
Yutaka Ozaki - Sony Music Records 
Yutaka Ozaki English Site

1965 births
1992 deaths
Japanese male singer-songwriters
Japanese male rock singers
People from Setagaya
20th-century Japanese male singers
20th-century Japanese singers